Tetiana Rizhko is a Ukrainian freestyle wrestler. She is a two-time medalist, including gold, at the European Wrestling Championships.

Career 

She competed in the women's freestyle event of the 2019 Wrestling World Cup.

In 2020, she won the gold medal in the women's 65kg event at the Individual Wrestling World Cup held in Belgrade, Serbia. In the final, she defeated Irina Rîngaci of Moldova.

In 2021, she won the silver medal in the 65kg event at the European Wrestling Championships held in Warsaw, Poland. She won the gold medal in her event at the 2021 European U23 Wrestling Championship held in Skopje, North Macedonia. In October 2021, she competed in the women's 65kg event at the World Wrestling Championships held in Oslo, Norway where she was eliminated in her first match by Koumba Larroque of France.

In 2022, she won the gold medal in the 65kg event at the European Wrestling Championships held in Budapest, Hungary. In the final, she defeated Elis Manolova of Azerbaijan. A few months later, she won the gold medal in her event at the Matteo Pellicone Ranking Series 2022 held in Rome, Italy. She competed in the 65kg event at the 2022 World Wrestling Championships held in Belgrade, Serbia.

She won the gold medal in her event at the 2023 Ibrahim Moustafa Tournament held in Alexandria, Egypt.

Achievements

References

External links 

 

Living people
Year of birth missing (living people)
Place of birth missing (living people)
Ukrainian female sport wrestlers
European Wrestling Championships medalists
European Wrestling Champions
21st-century Ukrainian women